Alexandre Grendene Bartelle (born January 2, 1950) is a Brazilian businessman and billionaire. In 1971, co-founded sandal manufacturer Grendene with his brother, Pedro Grendene Bartelle. According to Forbes, he was worth US$1.86 billion as of May 2016.

Biography

Early life and education 
Bartelle was born in Farroupilha, Rio Grande do Sul. He studied at Universidade de Caxias do Sul, graduating with a bachelor's degree in Law.

Personal life 
He currently lives in Porto Alegre and has seven children. In 2015, he donated funds for the construction of a veterinary hospital in Porto Alegre. He owns an Amels Limited Editions 199 yacht and a Falcon 7X jet.

Career 
In 1971, Alexandre and Pedro co-founded Grendene. Their grandfather lent them capital to purchase plastic injection molding machines and hire five employees. By May 2016, he was worth US$1.86billion.

References 

1950 births
Living people
People from Rio Grande do Sul
Brazilian people of Italian descent
Brazilian chief executives
Brazilian billionaires
Brazilian philanthropists
Brazilian twins
People from Porto Alegre